Lee Chia-hao (born 4 June 1999) is a Taiwanese badminton player from AP team.

Career 
Lee was born in a badminton family. His father Lee Mou-chou is a former national champion who now works as Land Bank team head coach, and his sister Lee Chia-hsin is a member of national team. He has won several junior titles in his career, namely 2016 Australian Junior International in both singles and doubles events, Singapore Youth International, 2017 German Junior Grand Prix, and defended his boys' singles Australian title. He also won the silver medal at the 2016 Asian Junior Championships. With his achievements, the 17-year-old, Lee became the first Taiwanese player to rank no. 1 in the world junior rankings in January 2017.

Achievements

Asian Junior Championships 
Boys' singles

BWF International Challenge/Series (1 title, 3 runners-up) 
Men's singles

Men's doubles

  BWF International Challenge tournament
  BWF International Series tournament
  BWF Future Series tournament

BWF Junior International (5 titles) 
Boys' singles

Boys' doubles

  BWF Junior International Grand Prix tournament
  BWF Junior International Challenge tournament
  BWF Junior International Series tournament
  BWF Junior Future Series tournament

References

External links 

1999 births
Living people
Taiwanese male badminton players